Plastic Paddy is a slang expression for the cultural appropriation evidenced by unconvincing or obviously non-native Irishness. The phrase has been used as a positive reinforcement and as a derogatory term in various situations, particularly in London but also within Ireland itself. The term has sometimes been applied to people who may misappropriate or misrepresent stereotypical aspects of Irish customs. In this sense, the plastic Paddy may know little of actual Irish culture, but nevertheless assert an Irish identity. In other contexts, the term has been applied to members of the Irish diaspora who have distanced themselves from perceived stereotypes and, in the 1980s, the phrase was used to describe Irish people who had emigrated to England and were seeking assimilation into English culture.

Usage
The name Paddy is a diminutive form of the Irish name Patrick (Pádraic, Pádraig, Páraic) and, depending on context, can be used either as an affectionate or a pejorative reference to an Irishman.

The term "plastic Paddy" came into use in the 1980s when it was frequently employed as a term of abuse by recently arrived middle-class Irish migrants to London. Hickman states: it 'became a means of distancing themselves from established Irish communities.' And the use was a part of the process by which the second-generation Irish are positioned as inauthentic within the two identities, of Englishness and Irishness.

People who were not born in Ireland and/or did not grow up in Ireland, but nonetheless possess Irish citizenship (either through descent, marriage, or residence) are sometimes labelled "plastic Paddies" by members of Irish communities.

The term can have a different connotation depending on where it is used.

Ireland
Within Ireland, "plastic Paddy" may refer to someone who misrepresents the Irish culture by enacting ethnic stereotypes that portray an inaccurate, outdated and offensive image of Ireland and Irish culture. This is often seen in non-Irish citizens who have a romantic or noble savage image of "the Irish Race" and those who enact stereotypes to appeal to tourists. This naming is a critical reaction to, and defiance of, the demeaning, inaccurate depictions of the Irish at celebrations that originated in the Irish diaspora, as well as the commercialisation and distortion of St. Patrick's Day.

The Killarney Active Retirement Association displayed a banner promising to "Chase the plastic Paddy out of Ireland" in the Kerry 2005 St Patrick's Day celebrations, and Irish journalists have used the term to characterise Irish bars in the diaspora as inauthentic and with the "minimum of plastic paddy trimmings."

"Plastic Paddy" has also be used as a derogatory term for Irish people who show more allegiance to English culture than Irish culture, such as those who support English football teams.  First generation Irish-English model Erin O'Connor was called a "plastic Paddy" in Ireland due to her parents' choice of forename and non-Irish birth despite them both being Irish citizens.

United Kingdom

Mary J. Hickman writes that "plastic Paddy" was a term used to "deny and denigrate the second-generation Irish in Britain" in the 1980s, and was "frequently articulated by the new middle-class Irish immigrants in Britain, for whom it was a means of distancing themselves from established Irish communities." According to Bronwen Walter, Professor of Irish Diaspora Studies at Anglia Ruskin University, the adoption of a hyphenated identity has been "much more problematic" for second-generation Irish people in Britain. Walter claims that the majority of these people have "frequently denied the authenticity of their Irish identity" by referring to themselves as "plastic Paddies", while the English people around them regard them as "assimilated and simply English".

The term has been used to taunt non-Irish born players who choose to play for the Republic of Ireland national football team, fans of Irish teams who are members of supporters clubs outside Ireland, and other Irish individuals living in Britain. A study by the University of Strathclyde and Nil by Mouth found the term was used abusively on Celtic and Rangers supporters' Internet forums in reference to Celtic supporters and the wider Catholic community in Scotland. In August 2009, an English man from Birmingham received a suspended sentence after making derogatory comments to a police officer who was of Irish origin. The prosecutor said the man had made racist remarks about the officer, including accusations that the officer was a "plastic Paddy".

In Peter Stanford's book Why I Am Still a Catholic: Essays in Faith and Perseverance, the broadcaster Dermot O'Leary (who was born and raised in England to Irish parents) describes his upbringing as "classic plastic Paddy", mentioning that his cousins in Ireland would tease him for "being English" but would defend him if other Irish people tried to do the same. Brendan O'Neill uses the term in Spiked to refer to "second-generation wannabe" Irishmen, and writes that some of those guilty of "plastic Paddyism" (or, in his words, "Dermot-itis") are Bill Clinton, Daniel Day-Lewis, and Shane MacGowan.

United States
Plastic Paddy is typically used in a derogatory fashion towards those who identify as Irish Americans or who celebrate "Irishness" on Saint Patrick's Day, accusing them of having little actual connection to Irish culture.  For example, British mixed martial arts fighter Dan Hardy has called American fighter Marcus Davis a "plastic Paddy" due to Marcus' enthusiasm for his Irish ancestry.

Alex Massie, a Scottish journalist, wrote in National Review:

See also 

 Cultural cringe
 Plastic Brit
 Plastic shaman
 Symbolic ethnicity
 Tartanry
 West Brit

Notes

References

External links

UK suffers from Plastic Paddy syndrome

Cultural appropriation
English phrases
Ethnic and religious slurs
Irish diaspora
Irish slang
1980s neologisms